Molchanovo is a rural locality (a selo) and the administrative center of Molchanovsky Selsoviet of Mazanovsky District, Amur Oblast, Russia. The population was 106 as of 2018. There are 7 streets.

Geography 
Molchanovo is located on the left bank of the Zeya River, 56 km southwest of Novokiyevsky Uval (the district's administrative centre) by road. Popovka is the nearest rural locality.

References 

Rural localities in Mazanovsky District